The 1988–89 season was Chelsea Football Club's seventy-fifth competitive season. The club returned to the First Division at the first attempt by winning the Second Division championship. Due to crowd trouble following the Football League play-off match against Middlesbrough the previous season, the Stamford Bridge terraces were closed for the first six home games of the season.

Table

References

External links
 1988–89 season at stamford-bridge.com

1988–89
English football clubs 1988–89 season